
Li Wei or Wei Li may refer to:

People surnamed Li
Li Wei (Tang dynasty) (died 879), Tang dynasty chief minister
Li Wei (Qing dynasty) (1687–1738), Qing dynasty mandarin

Politicians
Li Wei (born 1953), former director of the Development Research Center of the State Council
, former Vice Minister of Public Security of the People's Republic of China
Li Wei (born 1958), People's Republic of China politician in Beijing
Li Wei (born 1963), Chinese politician
, People's Republic of China politician in Jilin

Academics
Li Wei (computer scientist) (born 1943), Chinese computer scientist and president of Beijing University of Aeronautics and Astronautics
Li Wei (linguist), Chinese-born linguist at Birkbeck, University of London

Artists and entertainers
Li Wei (actor) (1919–2005), Chinese actor
Li Wei (artist) (born 1970), Chinese contemporary artist
Lee Wei (born 1980), Taiwanese singer and actor

Generals
Li Wei (born 1914), founding major general (Shaojiang) of the People's Liberation Army (PLA) of China
Li Wei (born 1960), general (Shangjiang) of the People's Liberation Army (PLA) of China and the current Political Commissar of the People's Liberation Army Strategic Support Force

Sportspeople
Li Wei (speed skater) (born 1961), Chinese male speed skater
Li Wei (figure skater) (born 1969), Chinese male figure skater
Li Wei (footballer, born 1975), Chinese male football goalkeeper and coach
Li Wei (field hockey) (born 1978), Chinese male field hockey player
Li Wei (swimmer) (born 1979), Chinese female swimmer
Li Wei (footballer, born 1985), Chinese male footballer

People surnamed Wei
Wei Li (runner) (born 1972), Chinese female long-distance runner

See also
Tuoba Liwei or Liwei (174–277), Xianbei chieftain during the Three Kingdoms and Jin dynasties